Adoneta bicaudata, the long-horned slug moth, is a species of slug caterpillar moth in the family Limacodidae.

The MONA or Hodges number for Adoneta bicaudata is 4684.

References

Further reading

 

Limacodidae
Articles created by Qbugbot
Moths described in 1904